Gorče is a small settlement on a river terrace above the right bank of the Drava River in the Municipality of Dravograd in the Carinthia region in northern Slovenia, right on the border with Austria.

References

External links
Gorče on Geopedia

Populated places in the Municipality of Dravograd